Sexual anomalies, also known as sexual abnormalities, are a set of clinical conditions due to chromosomal, gonadal and/or genitalia variation. Individuals with congenital (inborn) discrepancy between sex chromosome, gonadal, and their internal and external genitalia are categorised as individuals with a disorder of sex development (DSD). Afterwards, if the family or individual wishes, they can partake in different management and treatment options for their conditions (e.g. hormone therapy).

Infants born with atypical genitalia often cause confusion and distress for the family. Psychosexual development is influenced by numerous factors that include, but are not limited to, gender differences in brain structure, genes associated with sexual development, prenatal androgen exposure, interactions with family, and cultural and societal factors. Because of the complex and multifaceted factors involved, communication and psychosexual support are all important.

A team of experts, or patient support groups, are usually recommended for cases related to sexual anomalies. This team of experts are usually derived from a variety of disciplines including pediatricians, neonatologists, pediatric urologists, pediatric general surgeons, endocrinologists, geneticists, radiologists, psychologists and social workers. These professionals are capable of providing first line (prenatal) and second line diagnostic (postnatal) tests to examine and diagnose sexual anomalies.

Overview 

In the normal prenatal stages of fetal development, the fetus is exposed to testosterone - albeit more in male fetuses than female ones. Upon the presence of the 5α-reductase enzyme, testosterone is converted to dihydrotestosterone (i.e. DHT). If DHT is present, the male external genitalia will develop.

Development of male external genitalia:

 Genital tubercle forms the penis
 Urethral folds forms the urethra
 Genital swelling forms the scrotum

On the other hand, if maternal placenta estrogen is present without DHT, then the development of female external genitalia occurs.

Development of female external genitalia:

 Genital tubercle forms the clitoris
 Urethral folds forms the labia minora 
 Genital swelling forms the labia majora

However, in abnormal cases, sexual anomalies occur due to a variety of factors that lead to an excess of androgens in the fetus. The effects of excessive androgens differ in fetuses with XX chromosome (female) and XY chromosomes (male).

In XX chromosome fetuses, excess androgens result in ambiguous genitalia. This makes identification of external genitalia as male or female difficult. Additionally, the individual may have clitoromegaly, a shallow vagina, early and rapid growth of pubic hair in childhood, delayed puberty, hirsutism, virilisation, irregular menstrual cycle in adolescence and infertility due to anovulation.

In XY chromosome fetuses, excess androgens result in a functional and average-sized penis with extreme virilisation, but the inability for sperm production. Additionally, the individual will also experience early and rapid growth of pubic hair during childhood and precocious puberty stages.

Classification 
Differences/disorders of sexual development (DSD) are classified into different categories: chromosomal variation, gonadal development disorders, abnormal genital development and others.

Chromosomal variation 

DSDs caused by chromosomal variation generally do not present with genital ambiguity. This includes sex chromosome DSDs such as Klinefelter syndrome, Turner syndrome and 45,X or 46,XY gonadal dysgenesis.

Males with Klinefelter syndrome usually have a karyotype of 47,XXY as a result of having two or more X chromosomes. Affected patients generally have normal genital development, yet are infertile and have small, poor functioning testes, breast growth and delayed puberty. The incidence for 47,XXY is 1 in 500 males, but severe and rare cases of Klinefelter syndrome presents as three or more X chromosomes.

Turner syndrome is classified as aneuploidy or structural rearrangement of the X chromosome. Signs and symptoms of affected females vary among them, such as low birth weight, low-set ears, short stature, short neck and delayed puberty. The incidence is 1 in 2500 live-born females, while most patients do not survive for more than one year after birth.

Gonadal development disorders 
Gonadal development disorders form a wide spectrum, classified by their cytogenetic and histopathological features. However, unsolved diagnosis and malignancy still represent difficulties in the sex determination of these patients. Such disorders include partial or complete gonadal dysgenesis, ovotesticular DSD, testicular DSD and sex reversal.

Abnormal genital development 
Genital abnormality can occur in the penis, scrotum or testes in males; and vagina and labia in females. Sometimes, ambiguous genitalia could occur, where the clear distinction of external genitalia is absent in both male and female. Hence, examination (typically at birth) is carried out where the sex of the patient will be determined through imaging and blood tests. Abnormal genital development includes disorders of fetal origin, disorders in androgen synthesis or action, disorders in anti-Müllerian hormone synthesis or action.

Others 
In addition to the aforementioned sexual anomalies, there are other unclassified sexual anomalies. In males, this includes severe early-onset intrauterine growth restriction, isolated hypospadias, congenital hypogonadotropic hypogonadism, hypogonadism and cryptorchidism. In females, this includes Malformation syndromes, Müllerian agenesis/hypoplasia, uterine anomalies, vaginal atresia and labial adhesions.

Causes 
Sexual anomalies often generate from genetic abnormalities caused by many factors, leading to different sexual development. These genetic abnormalities occur during the prenatal stage of an individuals' fetal development. During this stage, genetic mutations can result from endocrine disrupters in the mother's diet or environmental factors. The general causes of sexual anomalies can not be outlined due to the high variability of each individual's situations. Thus, the cause of each specific anomaly has to be studied independently.

Sexual differentiation occurs through various processes during the prenatal development period of the fetus. These processes are initiated and regulated by biological metabolites such as DNA, hormones and proteins. The initial steps of sexual differentiation begin with the development of the gonads and genitals. This process is consistent with both genders spanning over the course of the first 6 weeks following conception, during which the embryo remains pluripotent. Differentiation of the gonads begins after the 6th week, which is determined by the sex-determining region Y (SRY) gene in the Y chromosome.

The SRY gene plays an important role in developing the testes of a male individual. Following the development of the testes, hormones synthesized within the testes regulate the differentiation of both internal and external parts of the genitals. The absence of the testicles or the hormones synthesized may lead to irregular differentiation of the genitals. Genetic abnormalities or environmental factors that influence these procedures may lead to the incomplete development of the gonads and the genitals. These malformations can occur any time during the development or the birth of the embryo, manifesting as ambiguous genitals or dissonance within the genotypic and phenotypic sex of the individual, leading to a late onset of puberty, amenorrhea, a lack of or excess virilization, or later in life, infertility or early occurrence of menopause.

Diagnosis and symptoms

First line diagnostic tests (prenatal)

Family history 

 Symptoms such as infertility, early menopause, amenorrhea or sudden infant death syndrome (SIDS) could be a sign. Hence, an early check-up should be conducted.

Analysis of karyotype 

 Peripheral blood is collected for karyotyping. This helps classify the patient in one of the three main categories of DSD: chromosomal variation, gonadal development disorders and abnormal genital development.

Abdominal ultrasounds 

 The presence of gonads, uterus and vagina should be monitored. This can be done through abdominal ultrasounds. However, the absence of these sex organs will lead to difficulties in gender identification.

Second line diagnostic tests (postnatal)

Physical Examination 

 Inspection of the genitalia with care and palpation must be conducted with the following points in mind.
 Determining the degree of virilization or masculinisation:
 In a female fetus, the Prader scale should be used to assess the extent of the virilisation if the karyotyping results are not out yet.
 In males, the external masculinization score should be used.
 Palpation of gonads from the labioscrotal fold to the abdomen (inguinal canal).
 Hydration and blood pressure assessment should be conducted.
 Additional dysmorphic features should be ruled out because genitalia malformations would occur if the patient has multiple malformation syndromes.

Evaluation of hormones 48 hours after birth 

 17-Hydroxyprogesterone can be used to screen for congenital adrenal hyperplasia (CAH). This is commonly found in patients with 46, XX DSD.
 Dehydroepiandrosterone (DHEA) in addition to progesterone allows for the diagnosis of more uncommon forms of CAH and other inherited disorders.
 Base testosterone, follicle stimulating hormone (FSH) and luteinising hormone (LH) levels are precursors in individuals with 46,XX DSD. These tests are conducted within the timeframe of thirty hours post-birth to anywhere between fifteen and ninety days post-birth. This data collected within time frame can be used to gauge the growth of the fetus when it reaches six months of age.
 Basal cortisol levels and adrenocorticotropic hormone (ACTH) is essential in diagnosing panhypopituitarism and enzymatic disorders affecting adrenal steroidogenesis.
 The anti-Müllerian hormone is used for evaluating the function of Sertoli cells.
 A urinary steroid profile shows the ratio of precursor metabolites within measured urine concentrations and the resultant products produced indicates the enzyme is the cause of a sexual defect. This is a more specific procedure in the detection of the defect in comparison to analysing blood.

Treatment and management 
The treatment and/or management of DSDs with atypical genitalia will vary from person to person. This may include gender assignment, medical treatment and surgical treatment.

Gender assignment 
Gender assignment plays a critical role in the management of sexual anomaly cases. Ultimately, the parents and a multidisciplinary team are responsible for assigning the gender. The current guidelines of gender assignment include the psychosocial effects in adults with etiological diagnosis, the potential for fertility, surgical opportunities and hormone replacement therapy in the course of puberty.

There are other factors considered during this process. This may include cultural and religious factors as well as the implications it has on the individual in later life. It is regulated by reference centers with groups specialised in managing cases of sexual anomalies.

Medical treatment 
Hormonal treatment is an accepted and standardised approach to treat different congenital sexual anomalies. Patients that are deficient in hormones produced by the adrenal glands require immediate medical attention. They are given a hormone called hydrocortisone, a form of hormone replacement therapy, with the objective to induce puberty.

Utilizing sex steroids as hormonal therapy is deemed controversial with concerns of its duration of initiation, dosage and regimen. However, it is agreed amongst most clinicians that low doses of hormonal treatment should begin around the age of 11 to 12 years old and should be increased progressively.

Surgical treatment 
Surgical procedures are an alternative to hormonal treatment available for patients to address genital anomalies and improve the body's sexual functions. However, a common dilemma in these procedures is that they are often derived from the patient's expectation of 'normal' genitals from an aesthetic and functional standpoint. Oftentimes, this leads to extensive surgical interventions.

In most cases, surgical procedures result in permanent changes to the appearance and function of the patient's body. Therefore, the decision to proceed with this arrangement must be a joint agreement between the family and the multidisciplinary team. The most ideal situation would be to include the patient as part of the decision-making process. However, cases where surgical treatments were performed at an early age are recognised as mutilation of the body. Subsequently, it has become increasingly common to defer surgical treatments until the patient is of appropriate age to be involved in the decision-making process.

Controversy and implications 
Even though the term disorder of sex development (DSD) is widely accepted by the medical community, its suitability and adequacy to represent these individuals are criticised by many support and advocacy groups. Firstly, the word 'disorder' carries negative connotations. Secondly, with current nomenclature, DSD is an overly generalised term for conditions that do not have differences in genital appearance or gender identity (e.g. Klinefelter syndrome and Turner syndrome). Thirdly, the term 'DSD' lacks specificity and clarity; and therefore unhelpful in the diagnosis process. Hence, many support groups and advocates believe that the medical community should discontinue the use of 'DSD' as a designation tool.

Furthermore, people who live with conditions regarding sexual abnormalities may encounter various mental and physical health problems. This may include traumatic experience with their own bodies, dissatisfaction with body image, low-self esteem, anxiety, depression, bipolar disorders, eating disorders, personality disorders, schizophrenia disorders, trauma and stress-related disorders, etc.

See also 

 Intersex medical interventions
 Patient support group

References 

Sexuality
Sex organs
Diseases and disorders